Boutiliers Point is a rural community in the Halifax Regional Municipality  on the shore of the Atlantic Ocean on Trunk 3, 27.61 kilometers from Halifax.

The community evolved after Jacques Boutilier's son, James Frederick and Jacques' nephew John Coulaw Boutilier *purchased in September 20, 1794 from Charles Ingram's son-in-law, William Coolen, the 1500 acre Ingram Grant for 140 pounds, to be paid 20 pounds yearly.  This area later became known as Boutilier's Point, likely named for James Frederick Boutilier, a patriarch of the community.

Many in the community have the last name of Boutilier  . It is common that one is referred to by one's first name followed by the name of one's father (e.g., Tom the son of Eric Boutilier becomes Tom Eric).

Boutiliers Point is home to the Willard Christie Memorial Park, which includes a playground, located at the top of Christie's Road and Island View Drive, and a baseball pitch located down a short driveway, which is frequented by dog walkers. There is also an outdoor ice rink that is a hot spot for hockey players in the winter months.

Another attraction in Boutiliers Point is the Bay Lookout Provincial Park, which includes a small beach and a wharf used in the summer months for mackerel and squid fishing, and as a dock for a few lobster fishing boats.

Demographics 

References

Communities in Halifax, Nova Scotia
Designated places in Nova Scotia
General Service Areas in Nova Scotia